Neblinichthys brevibracchium is a species of catfish in the family Loricariidae. It is native to South America, where it occurs in the Mazaruni River in the Essequibo River drainage in Guyana. The species reaches 8 cm (3.1 inches) SL.

References 

Ancistrini
Fish described in 2010